Staley is a surname. Notable people with the surname include:

Brandon Staley, American football coach
Dawn Staley, American basketball player and coach
Duce Staley, former professional American football player and current coach
Joan Staley, Playboy's "Miss November" 1958, movie and television actress and singer
Joe Staley, professional American football player
Jonathan Staley, English footballer
Layne Staley (1967-2002), lead singer of Alice in Chains and Mad Season
Luke Staley, former American, professional football player
Steve Staley, American voice actor
Thomas F. Staley (1935/36-2022), American literary scholar and librarian
Thomas Nettleship Staley (1823–1898), first Anglican Bishop of Hawaii
Tony Staley, former Australian politician
Vernon Staley, Anglo-Catholic writer
Staley Da Bear, official mascot of the Chicago Bears